Khassimirou Diop  (born 28 December 1986) is a Senegalese footballer who is a junior-level coach, and still registered to play as a midfielder, with French side Cholet B.

Career
Diop arrived in France at the age of 13, and joined the training center of FC Nantes. He made his debut at the professional level for Nantes as a second half substitute in the Ligue 1 game against Sochaux on 14 October 2016.

After leaving Nantes he played in the fourth tier with UJA Alfortville and JA Drancy before joining SO Cholet in the fifth tier. He was part of the Cholet side which achieved promotion from Championnat de France Amateur 2 in 2015 and Championnat de France Amateur 2 in 2017. Now a coach with the U10 side at Cholet, despite not playing since for the first team since May 2018 he remains available to be called up, as happened in November 2020.

References

External links

1986 births
Living people
Senegalese footballers
FC Nantes players
Ligue 1 players
Ligue 2 players
Championnat National players
Championnat National 2 players
Championnat National 3 players
UJA Maccabi Paris Métropole players
JA Drancy players
SO Cholet players
GSI Pontivy players
Association football midfielders
Footballers from Dakar